Globia algae, the rush wainscot, is a moth of the family Noctuidae. The species was first described by Eugenius Johann Christoph Esper in 1789. It is found in central and southern Europe (and very sporadically in north-western Europe), Turkey, Armenia, northern Caucasus, south-west Siberia.

The genus Capsula was renamed Globia because of a naming conflict with a mollusk.

Technical description and variation

The wingspan is 32–45 mm. Forewing yellowish rufous, the rufous tint predominating in the male, the yellowish in the female; veins more or less tinged with grey; a dark smudge at lower angle of cell; an outer row of dark vein-dots; hindwing grey with a dark paler-edged outer line; a rare form, ab. liturata ab. nov. [Warren] has both lines complete and dentate throughout, the median vein thickly black; - in the Norfolk Fens a very dark form occurs, ab. fumata ab. nov. [Warren] with the wings, especially in the male, dark brown or black brown.

Biology
Adults are on wing from July to September depending on the location. There is one generation per year.

The larvae are greenish dotted with black; head brown; thoracic plate pale green. The larvae bore the stems of Scirpus lacustris, Typha species and Iris pseudacorus.

References

External links

"09868 Globia algae (Esper, 1789) - Teichröhricht-Schilfeule". Lepiforum e.V. Retrieved 29 June 2019.

Xyleninae
Moths described in 1789
Moths of Europe
Moths of Asia
Taxa named by Eugenius Johann Christoph Esper